The original national flag of Burundi (Kirundi: ibendera ry'Uburundi) was adopted after the country's independence from Belgium on 1 July 1962. It went through several revisions and now consists of a white saltire which divides the field into alternating red and green areas. The center of the saltire merges into a white disk, on which there are three red solid six-pointed stars outlined in green. The current ratio is 3:5, which was changed from 2:3 on 27 September 1982.

Symbolism 

The flag is divided into four parts by a white saltire. The upper and lower parts are red in color, while the left and right ones are green in color. The white color of the saltire represents peace, green represents the nation's hopes placed on future development, and red symbolizes the suffering of the nation during its freedom struggle. The three stars in triangular configuration stand for the three ethnic groups of Burundi: the Hutu, the Twa and the Tutsi. The three stars also stand for the three elements of the national motto: Unité, Travail, Progrès ("Unity, Work and Progress"), which can be seen on the coat of arms of Burundi. They also represent the loyalty that the citizens of the nation have pledged to their God, king and country.

Colors 
The colours are defined in the constitution as simply green, white, and red.  Nowhere does the government document any specific colour shades.
For lack of any official standard, the colours used at the 2012 Olympics are shown in the table below.

Construction Sheet

History 

When the monarchy ruled over Burundi a variant flag featuring a karyenda (a drum said to have divine power) was used. It was believed that the drum's messages could be understood only by the mwami (rulers) who made it the laws of the state. Following the abolition of the monarchy in November 1966, the karyenda was removed from the flag and the other flag was adopted soon after. The karyenda was replaced with a sorghum plant which is an important agricultural product of the country.

See also 
List of Burundian flags

References

External links 

 

Flags introduced in 1967
Flags introduced in 1982
Flag
Flags of Africa
Burundi